Sociedades anónimas inscrito de capital abierto (S.A.I.C.A.) is a type of companiesy in Argentina.

Unitán, a company producing Quebracho tannins, is an example of the type of companies.

See also 
 List of business entities
 S.A. (corporation)

References 

Companies of Argentina